Hall L. Brooks was a member of the Wisconsin State Assembly.

Biography
Brooks was born on October 1, 1864, in Medford, Massachusetts. In the mid-1880s, he moved to Schofield, Wisconsin. He later moved again to Langlade County, Wisconsin before settling in Tomahawk, Wisconsin in 1898. Brooks was a lumberman by trade. In 1891, he married Edith Belanger.

Political career
Brooks was elected to the Assembly in 1904. Additionally, he was a member of the Langlade County board of supervisors and Chairman of the Lincoln County, Wisconsin board of supervisors. He was a Republican.

References

Politicians from Medford, Massachusetts
People from Schofield, Wisconsin
People from Langlade County, Wisconsin
People from Tomahawk, Wisconsin
Republican Party members of the Wisconsin State Assembly
County supervisors in Wisconsin
Businesspeople in timber
1864 births
Year of death missing